The 1968–69 Dayton Flyers men's basketball team represented the University of Dayton during the 1968–69 NCAA University Division men's basketball season.

Roster

Schedule

|-
!colspan=9 style=| NCAA Tournament

References 

Dayton Flyers men's basketball seasons
Dayton
Dayton
Dayton
Dayton